Thiago Eduardo de Andrade (born 31 October 2000) is a Brazilian professional footballer who plays as a forward for Major League Soccer club New York City FC.

Career
Born in Araras, Andrade began his career at Fluminense before moving to Portugal and joining Portimonense. He soon moved back to Brazil to join Bahia. Andrade made his professional debut for the club on 6 January 2021 against Grêmio, starting in a 2–1 defeat. He scored his first goal a couple weeks later on 20 January in a 1–0 victory over Athletico Paranaense.

New York City FC
On 10 April 2021, Andrade joined Major League Soccer club New York City FC.

Andrade made his MLS debut on 19 June 2021, being brought as a substitute at half-time. After only 10 minutes on the field, he scored the equalizer against New England Revolution, making the game 1-1. NYCFC would then lose the match 3-2.

Career statistics

Honours
New York City FC
MLS Cup: 2021
Campeones Cup: 2022

References

2000 births
Living people
Footballers from São Paulo (state)
Brazilian footballers
Association football forwards
Esporte Clube Bahia players
New York City FC players
Campeonato Brasileiro Série A players
Brazilian expatriate footballers
Expatriate soccer players in the United States
Major League Soccer players